Richard Dawson (born Colin Lionel Emm; 20 November 1932 – 2 June 2012) was a British-born American actor, comedian, game-show host and panelist in the United States. Dawson was well known for playing Corporal Peter Newkirk in Hogan's Heroes, as a regular panelist on Match Game (1973–1978), and as the original as well as third host of Family Feud (1976–1985, 1994–95).

Early life
Colin Lionel Emm was born in Gosport, Hampshire, England, on 20 November 1932 to Arthur Emm (born 1897) and Josephine Lucy Emm ( Lindsay; born 1903). His father drove a removal van and his mother worked in a munitions factory. He and his brother John Leslie Emm (five years older) were evacuated as children during World War II to escape the bombing of England's major port cities in the south. In a radio interview with Hogan's Heroes co-star Bob Crane, Dawson recounted how this experience severely limited his school attendance, stating that he attended school regularly for only two years.

At age 14, he ran away from home to join the British Merchant Navy, where he pursued a career in boxing, earning almost $5,000 in shipboard matches. During 1950 and 1951, he made several passages on the RMS Mauretania from Southampton to ports of call, including Nassau, the Bahamas, Havana, and New York. Following his discharge from the merchant service, he began pursuing a comedy career using the stage name Dickie Dawson; he later changed his alias to Richard Dawson, which he eventually adopted as his legal name.

Career

Comedy and variety artist in the UK
Emm began his career in England as a stand-up comedian known as Dickie Dawson. Possibly his first television appearance occurred on 21 June 1954, when he was 21 and was featured on the Benny Hill Showcase, an early BBC Television programme focused on "introducing artists and acts new to television".

He also had at least four BBC Radio programme appearances during 1954, including two bookings on the Midday Music Hall on BBC Home Service and two spots on How Do You Do, a BBC Light Entertainment broadcast billed as "a friendly get-together of Commonwealth artists."

In 1958, he appeared alongside his future wife, Diana Dors, on BBC TV's A to Z: D, a programme featuring entertainers with names beginning with the letter D. In 1959, he made four appearances on BBC TV's Juke Box Jury, three of them alongside Dors, to whom he was by then married.

Actor and comedian in the US 
In September 1961, Dawson began hosting a late-night talk show, the Mike Stokey Show, on Los Angeles television station KCOP-TV. On 8 January 1963, Dawson appeared on The Jack Benny Program, season 13, episode 15, as an audience member seated next to Jack, barely recognisable in glasses and false moustache. In the same year Dawson made a guest appearance on The Dick Van Dyke Show (season 2, episode 27) playing "Racy" Tracy Rattigan, a lecherous flirt who was the summer replacement host on the Alan Brady Show. He was credited as Dick Dawson.

In 1965, Dawson had a small role at the end of the film King Rat, starring George Segal, playing 1st Recon paratrooper Captain Weaver, sent to liberate allied POWs in a Japanese prison. Dawson had by then moved to Los Angeles. He gained fame in the television show Hogan's Heroes as Cpl. Peter Newkirk from 1965 to 1971. He had a minor role in Universal's Munster, Go Home!. A year later, Dawson released a psychedelic 45-rpm single including the songs "His Children's Parade" and "Apples & Oranges" on Carnation Records. In 1968, Dawson was in the film The Devil's Brigade as Private Hugh McDonald.

Following the cancellation of Hogan's Heroes, Dawson was a regular joke-telling panellist on the short-lived syndicated revival of the game show Can You Top This? in 1970 and joined the cast of Rowan & Martin's Laugh-In that same year.

After Laugh-In was cancelled in 1973, game-show pioneer Mark Goodson signed Dawson to appear as a regular on Match Game '73, alongside Brett Somers, Charles Nelson Reilly, and host Gene Rayburn. Dawson, who had already served a year as panellist for Goodson's revival of I've Got a Secret, proved to be a solid and funny player, and was the frequent choice of contestants to participate in the Head-To-Head Match portion of the "Super-Match" bonus round, in which the contestant and a panellist of the contestant's choice had to match exactly. During Dawson's time on Match Game, he most often occupied the bottom centre seat, only sitting elsewhere (in the top centre seat) during one week early in the show's run.

Family Feud host and TV stardom

Due to his popularity on Match Game, Dawson expressed to Goodson his desire to host a show of his own. In 1975, during Dawson's tenure as one of Match Game regular panelists, Goodson began developing a spin-off game show, Family Feud. Dawson's agent practically demanded that Dawson be considered as host, even threatening that he would instruct Dawson not to display his characteristic wit on Match Game if he were overlooked. Goodson capitulated and, once seeing Dawson's talents as a host, hired Dawson to host Feud, which debuted on 12 July 1976, on ABC's daytime schedule. Family Feud was a break-out hit, eventually surpassing the ratings of Match Game in late 1977. In 1978, Dawson left Match Game due to a combination of the recent introduction of the "Star Wheel"—which affected his being selected for the "Head-To-Head Match" portion of the show's "Super Match" bonus round—and burnout from his regular appearances on both Match Game and Family Feud. Also in 1978, he won a Daytime Emmy Award for Best Game Show Host for his work on Family Feud. After he left Match Game, his spot on the panel was filled with many other stars—most notably his best friend Bob Barker, who was then the host of The Price is Right.

One of Dawson's trademarks on Family Feud, kissing the female contestants, earned him the nickname "The Kissing Bandit". Television executives repeatedly tried to get him to stop the kissing. After receiving criticism for the practice (which also included a great deal of physical contact such as holding hands and touching), he asked viewers to write in and vote on the matter. The wide majority of the approximately 200,000 responses favoured the kissing. On the 1985 finale, Dawson explained that he kissed contestants for love and luck, something his mother did with Dawson himself as a child.

Dawson was a frequent guest host for Tonight Show host Johnny Carson, hosting 14 times during 1979 and 1980. Dawson was a contender for the role of Tonight Show host in the event that Carson left the show, a move that Carson was seriously considering during 1979–80. (Carson ended up remaining as host until 1992.) Two of the few Carson-era Tonight Show episodes that did not air on the night they were intended were guest hosted by Dawson. During one, actress Della Reese suffered a near-fatal aneurysm mid-interview during taping; the remainder of the episode was cancelled. (Reese later recovered.) The other featured an untimely monologue regarding the danger of flying on airplanes; it was replaced with a rerun because it would have aired the same night as the crash of American Airlines Flight 191 in Chicago, which killed all 271 people aboard, as well as two on the ground. The episode was aired several weeks later.

Later years
Dawson parodied his TV persona in 1987's The Running Man opposite Arnold Schwarzenegger, portraying the evil, egotistical game-show host Damon Killian. He received rave reviews for his performance. Film critic Roger Ebert (who gave the film a thumbs down) wrote, "Playing a character who always seems three-quarters drunk, he chain-smokes his way through backstage planning sessions and then pops up in front of the cameras as a cauldron of false jollity. Working the audience, milking the laughs and the tears, he is not really much different [from] most genuine game-show hosts—and that's the film's private joke".

Dawson hosted an unsold pilot for a revival of the classic game show You Bet Your Life that was to air on NBC in 1988, but the network declined to pick up the show. In 1990, he auditioned to host the syndicated game show Trump Card; the role went to Jimmy Cefalo.

On 12 September 1994, Dawson returned to Family Feud, hosting what would become the last season of the show's second run (1988–1995) after previous host Ray Combs was fired due to spiralling ratings. During his second tenure as host, Dawson did not kiss female contestants because of a promise he had made to his young daughter to kiss only her mother. The show's ratings never recovered under Dawson and the final episode aired on 26 May 1995, after which Dawson officially retired. Family Feud remained out of production until being revived for a third run in 1999 with new host Louie Anderson, who asked Dawson to make a special appearance on the first episode to give Anderson his blessings. Dawson turned down the offer, wanting no further involvement with the show.

In 2000, Dawson narrated TV's Funniest Game Shows on the Fox network.

Personal life and family
With his first wife, actress Diana Dors, Dawson had two sons, Mark (born in London, 4 February 1960) and Gary (born in Los Angeles, 27 June 1962) The marriage ended with a divorce granted in Los Angeles in April 1967, and Dawson gained custody of both sons. He had four grandchildren.

On retiring, Dawson remained in Beverly Hills, California, where he had lived since 1964. He met his second wife, Gretchen Johnson (born 22 September 1955), when she was a contestant on Family Feud in May 1981; they married in 1991. A daughter, Shannon Nicole Dawson, was born in 1990. Dawson announced the birth and showed a picture of his daughter during the inaugural episode of his second stint as host of Feud in 1994 as he was greeting a contestant who had been a contestant on Match Game when he was a panelist. The episode was featured on the 25th anniversary of Family Feud as number two on the Game Show Network's top 25 Feud moments.

During the 1960s and 1970s, Dawson participated in various movements, including the Selma to Montgomery marches and George McGovern's 1972 presidential campaign.

Death
Dawson died at 79 from complications of esophageal cancer in Los Angeles on 2 June 2012 at the Ronald Reagan UCLA Medical Center. He is interred in Westwood Memorial Park, Los Angeles. His death came 16 years to the day after the 1996 suicide of Family Feud successor and predecessor, Ray Combs.

Dawson used to smoke almost four packs of cigarettes per day, and he was seen smoking on some episodes of Match Game, Family Feud, and Hogan's Heroes. His daughter Shannon convinced him to stop smoking by 1994, when he was 61.

On 7 June 2012, GSN aired a four-hour marathon of Dawson's greatest moments on Match Game and Family Feud, including the first episode of his 1994–95 Feud tenure.

Filmography

Film

Television

References

External links

 
 
 
 
 

1932 births
2012 deaths
20th-century American comedians
20th-century American male actors
20th-century English male actors
American game show hosts
American male comedians
American male film actors
American male television actors
American sketch comedians
British male comedy actors
British Merchant Navy personnel
British Merchant Navy personnel of World War II
British sketch comedians
Burials at Westwood Village Memorial Park Cemetery
Daytime Emmy Award for Outstanding Game Show Host winners
Deaths from cancer in California
Deaths from esophageal cancer
English emigrants to the United States
English game show hosts
English male comedians
English male film actors
English male television actors
Family Feud
People from Gosport